The blue-banded pitta (Erythropitta arquata) is a species of bird in the family Pittidae. It is endemic to the island of Borneo, where it is found in all three countries that share the island: Malaysia, Brunei and Indonesia. Its natural habitat is subtropical or tropical moist lowland forest.

References

 Alan P. Petersen Birds of the World

blue-banded pitta
Endemic birds of Borneo
blue-banded pitta
Taxonomy articles created by Polbot